Ursia noctuiformis is a species of moth in the family Notodontidae (the prominents). It was first described by William Barnes and James Halliday McDunnough in 1911 and it is found in North America.

The MONA or Hodges number for Ursia noctuiformis is 8002.

References

Further reading

 
 
 

Notodontidae
Articles created by Qbugbot
Moths described in 1911